Pokla is a small village/hamlet in Kamdara block in  Gumla District of Jharkhand State, India. It is located south of District headquarters Gumla and 35 km from State capital Ranchi.

References

Villages in Gumla district